= Chalkai =

Town in ancient Thessaly

Coordinates: 39°33′25″N 22°29′49″E

Chalkai (Ancient Greek: Χαλκαί) was a town in ancient Thessaly.

Its site is tentatively located near Nikaia Larisis.
